Tim Timmons may refer to:

 Tim Timmons (musician) (born 1976), American contemporary Christian singer-songwriter
 Tim Timmons (umpire) (born 1967), American MLB umpire